The 1995 Amstel Gold Race was the 30th edition of the annual road bicycle race "Amstel Gold Race", held on Sunday April 22, 1995, in the Dutch province of Limburg. The race stretched 256 kilometres, with the start in Heerlen and the finish in Maastricht. There were a total of 192 competitors, with 56 cyclists finishing the race.

Result

External links
Results

Amstel Gold Race
1995 in road cycling
1995 in Dutch sport
Amstel Gold Race
April 1995 sports events in Europe